Morsang-sur-Seine (literally Morsang on Seine) is a commune in the Essonne department in Île-de-France in northern France. Inhabitants of Morsang-sur-Seine are known as Morsandiaux.

The orientalist Rubens Duval (1839–1911) was born in Morsang-sur-Seine.

Geography

Situation 

Located right bank of the Seine, on a bend of the Seine and backed by the forest of Rougeau, Morsang-sur-seine is a rural Department of Essonne.

Although at least 40 kilometers from Paris, by a wise policy planning, it has preserved its original charm and offers quiet and residential comfort.

Village life as naturally turned toward the river (plant water production, shipbuilding, water sports, camping, fishing) to the forest (logging, sports, hunting).

Climate 

Morsang-sur-Seine, situated in Île-de-France, benefit from an oceanic climate   fresh winters and soft summer, with regular precipitation on the whole year. On average annual, the temperature becomes established in 10,8 °C, with an annual maximal average of 15,2 °C and a minimal average of 6,4 °C. The record of the lowest temperature was established on January 17, 1985 with 19,8 °C. The slightest urban population density explains a constant negative difference from two to three degrees raised(found) between Auvernaux and Paris. The period of sunshine adding up 1 798 hours is comparable to all the regions in the North of the Loire but lesser than in the North of the department by the frequent presence of tablecloth of mist near the Seine, fields and vast forests. The precipitation become established in annual 598,3 millimeters, with a monthly average close to fifty millimeters and a point(headland) in sixty three millimeters in May.

See also
Communes of the Essonne department

References

External links

Official website 

Communes of Essonne
Sénart